Marselis is a Dutch surname, given to the wealthy Marselis family. Notable people with this surname include:

Gabriel Marselis, Dutch tradesman and landowner
Constantin Marselis, Dutch nobleman
Selius Marselis, Dutch-Norwegian tradesman
Gabriel Marselis, Sr., Dutch merchant
Christof Marselis, Polish-Dutch architect

See also
Marsalis, surname
Marcellus (name), given name and surname